Farmen 2018 (The Farm 2018) was the 11th season of the Swedish version of The Farm reality television show. The show premiered on January 7, 2018 on TV4.

Format
Twelve contestants are chosen from the outside world. Each week one contestant is selected the Farmer of the Week. In the first week, the contestants choose the Farmer. Since week 2, the Farmer is chosen by the contestant evicted in the previous week.

Nomination process
The Farmer of the Week nominates two people (a man and a woman) as the Butlers. The others must decide which Butler is the first to go to the Battle. That person then chooses the second person (from the same sex) for the Battle and also the type of battle (a quiz, extrusion, endurance, sleight). The Battle winner must win two duels. The Battle loser is evicted from the game.

Finishing order
Ages stated are at time of contest.

Sjöavikens
Starting in week three, former contestants are taken to Sjöavikens where they will live and compete until one of them wins the final dual and returns to the farm.

Sjöavikens duels

The game

Notes
 After Daniella lost the dual, she could only choose either Linda or Helena to become the Farmer of the Week. She chose Linda.

References

External links

The Farm (franchise)
2018 Swedish television seasons